Hydrelia shioyana is a moth in the family Geometridae first described by Shōnen Matsumura in 1927. It is found in Japan and Russia.

The wingspan is 13–16 mm.

References

Moths described in 1927
Asthenini
Moths of Japan
Moths of Asia